The Final Patient is a 2005 American horror thriller film directed by Jerry Mainardi and starring Bill Cobbs.

Plot

Cast
Bill Cobbs as Dr. Daniel Green
Alex Feldman as Cameron Streckman
Jason Scott Campbell as Willy Jenkins
Lizan Mitchell as Elizabeth Green
Guy Boyd as Sheriff McKnee

Reception
Christopher Null of Contactmusic.com awarded the film two and a half stars out of five.

References

External links
 
 

2005 films
American horror thriller films
2000s English-language films
2000s American films